The K League Top Scorer Award has been awarded to the top goalscorers of K League since the 1983 season.

K League 1  winners (1983–present)

K League 2 winners (2013–present)

See also
 K League
 K League records and statistics
 K League MVP Award
 K League Top Assist Provider Award
 K League Manager of the Year Award
 K League Young Player of the Year Award
 K League FANtastic Player
 K League Best XI
 K League Players' Player of the Year

External links
 All-time winners at K League 
 History at K League 

K League trophies and awards
1983 establishments in South Korea
Awards established in 1983
Annual events in South Korea
South Korea